The Dime Savings Bank of New York, originally the Dime Savings Bank of Brooklyn, was a bank headquartered in Brooklyn, New York City. It operated from 1859 to 2002.

The bank was formerly headquartered at 9 DeKalb Avenue, built in 1906-08 in Downtown Brooklyn. Dime was acquired by Washington Mutual in 2002, which subsequently failed in 2008 and was acquired by JPMorgan Chase, which currently owns all former Dime assets.

History 
In July 1994, Dime Bancorp announced the pending acquisition of the Hewlett, New York-based Anchor Bancorp with its Anchor Savings Bank, FSB subsidiary for $1.2 billion in stock. The acquisition was completed in January 1995. The merger resulted in a newly combined company with 76 branches in New York, 18 in New Jersey and 5 in Florida.

In September 1999, Hudson United Bancorp and Dime Bancorp announced a merger of equals that was worth $2 billion in stock. But before the merger could be implemented, North Fork Bancorporation initiated a hostile takeover attempt of Dime in March 2000. Since Dime was preoccupied with defending itself against North Fork, Dime and Hudson United decided to terminate their merger agreement in April. North Fork finally gave up in September 2000 after spending several months filling lawsuits against Dime and defending itself against counter lawsuits that were filed by Dime.

In June 2001, Washington Mutual announced the pending acquisition of Dime Bancorp for $5.2 billion in cash and stock. The acquisition was completed in January 2002. At the time of its acquisition, Dime had 123 branch offices in the New York City area in the states of New York and New Jersey. Washington Mutual subsequently failed in 2008. Dime was included in the assets that were sold to JPMorgan Chase by the Federal Deposit Insurance Corporation after Washington Mutual was seized and placed in receivership.

Headquarters 

The bank's headquarters at 9 DeKalb Avenue were built in 1906-08 and were designed by Mowbray and Uffinger.  It was significantly enlarged by Halsey, McCormack and Helmer in 1931-32. The headquarters is a New York City designated landmark. In December 2015, developers Michael Stern and Joe Chetrit closed on a $90 million purchase of the Dime Savings Bank headquarters. They planned to incorporate the structure into 9 DeKalb Avenue, planned as be the tallest building in Brooklyn. Construction began in 2018 and is scheduled to be completed in 2022.

References 
Notes

External links

 
 

Banks based in New York City
Companies based in Brooklyn
Banks established in 1859
Banks disestablished in 2002
1859 establishments in New York (state)
2002 disestablishments in New York (state)
Defunct banks of the United States
American companies established in 1859